Antonbruunidae is a family of polychaetes belonging to the order Phyllodocida.

Genera:
 Antonbruunia Hartman & Boss, 1966

References

Annelids